I Mean You is an album by pianist George Cables recorded in 1993 and released on the Danish label, SteepleChase.

Reception 

Scott Yanow of AllMusic stated, "Cables has long been underrated and he has been heard in a variety of settings through the years. This is one of his best boppish dates".

Track listing 
All compositions by George Cables except where noted.
 "Woofin' and Tweetin'" (Gene Ammons) – 7:46
 "Who Can I Turn To?" (Leslie Bricusse, Anthony Newley) – 8:59
 "I Mean You" (Thelonious Monk) – 5:18
 "For Heaven's Sake" (Sherman Edwards, Elise Bretton, Donald Meyer) – 8:09
 "Blackfoot" – 7:31
 "But He Knows" – 6:51
 "All or Nothing at All" (Arthur Altman, Jack Lawrence) – 8:17
 "Lush Life" (Billy Strayhorn) – 4:55
 "Double or Nothing" – 7:30

Personnel 
George Cables – piano
Jay Anderson – bass
Adam Nussbaum – drums

References 

George Cables albums
1994 albums
SteepleChase Records albums